NGC 255 is a barred spiral galaxy in the constellation Cetus. It was discovered on November 27, 1785, by Frederick William Herschel.

Notes

References

External links 
 
 SEDS

Astronomical objects discovered in 1785
MCG objects
002802
Cetus (constellation)
0255
Intermediate spiral galaxies